University Grants Commission ( Biśbobidyālaẏ mañjurī komiśan) of Bangladesh was established on 16 December 1972. It was created according to the Presidential Order (P.O. No 10 of 1973) of the Government of People's Republic of Bangladesh. In 2010, the Government of Bangladesh (GOB) announced bringing out reforms in University Grants Commission (UGC) and decided to change UGC into Higher Education Commission of Bangladesh (HEC).

Purpose
The UGC is the apex body of all the affiliated public, private and international universities of Bangladesh.

It provides funds for "Government Funded Universities" of Bangladesh. Its mission is to ensure the quality of higher education throughout the country. Private universities must obtain permission from UGC before they operate. 
UGC was designed to maintain the autonomous nature of the universities. The underlying principle is that the Government should not deal directly with the universities, either individually or collectively; instead, it should deal with the UGC, which, in turn, deals directly with the universities.
UGC offers scholarships to outstanding students, funds research, and organizes seminars.

Administrative structure 
BUGC consists of the following members:
 Chairman: Kazi Shahidullah
 Full-time members: 5
 Part-time members: 6
 Vice-Chancellors: 2 (by rotation)
 Professors of Universities: 3 (from the universities Vice-Chancellors of which are not members)
 Government nominees: 3 (Secretary, Minister of education, a member of the Planning Commission)
 Representative of the Ministry of Finance: 1 (not below the rank of a secretary)

Divisions
 Administrative Division
 Planning and Development Division
 Information Management, Communication and Training Division
 Finance and Accounts Division
 Private Universities Division
 Public Universities Division
 Research and Publication Division
 Strategic Planning, Quality Assurance and Right to Information Division
 Institute of Scientific Instrumentation (ISI) is a subsidiary organ of the University Grants Commission of Bangladesh.

Registered Universities
There are 43 public universities, 103 private universities, 2 international universities, 31 specialized colleges, and 2 special universities registered under UGC, Bangladesh.

References

External links 
 

Higher education in Bangladesh
Higher education authorities
Government commissions of Bangladesh
1973 establishments in Bangladesh
Regulators of Bangladesh